Brett Levis (born March 29, 1993) is a Canadian professional soccer player who plays as a midfielder for FC Tulsa in the USL Championship.

Club career

Early career
Levis spent his entire college career at the University of Saskatchewan.  He made a total of 50 appearances for the Huskies and tallied 29 goals and 16 assists.

He also played in the Premier Development League for Victoria Highlanders and Vancouver Whitecaps FC U-23.

Whitecaps FC 2
On February 24, 2015, Levis signed a professional contract with USL expansion side Whitecaps FC 2. He made his professional debut on March 29 in a 4–0 defeat to Seattle Sounders FC 2.

Vancouver Whitecaps FC
After signing a short-term MLS contract in July 2016, Levis made his first team debut against Central FC in the 2016–17 CONCACAF Champions League. In August 2016, Levis signed a first team deal with Vancouver Whitecaps FC through 2017, with options for the 2018 and 2019 seasons. In October 2016, Levis made his MLS debut against the Portland Timbers replacing Giles Barnes. In the same game, Levis would tear his ACL which would keep him out of play for the majority of the 2017 season.

Going in to the 2018 season, Levis was expected to play a bigger role on the club with the departure of Jordan Harvey in the offseason. Levis was released by Vancouver at the end of the 2019 season.

Valour FC
On January 30, 2020, Levis signed with Canadian Premier League side Valour FC. He made his debut on August 16 in a 2–0 loss to Cavalry FC.. In January 2022 Valour announced they had declined Levis' contract option. However, Valour re-signed Levis on February 25, 2022. In November 2022, he departed Valour.

FC Tulsa
Levis signed with USL Championship club FC Tulsa on November 15, 2022.

International career
Levis was named to Canada's 40-man provisional roster for the 2019 CONCACAF Gold Cup.

Career statistics

References

External links

Whitecaps FC 2 bio

1993 births
Living people
Association football midfielders
Canadian soccer players
Soccer people from Saskatchewan
Sportspeople from Saskatoon
Saskatchewan Huskies soccer players
FC Tulsa players
Victoria Highlanders players
Vancouver Whitecaps FC U-23 players
Whitecaps FC 2 players
Vancouver Whitecaps FC players
Valour FC players
USL League Two players
USL Championship players
Major League Soccer players
Canadian Premier League players